Epingline (Epingh) was a silk, or rayon, and wool fabric with fine cords. It was formed with a structure that was similar to a crepe.

Etymology 
The name “epingline” is derived from the French word épingle, meaning a pin.

Material and weave 
Epingline was woven with a warp of silk or rayon and a worsted weft.

Use 
The cloth was used as a dress material.

See also 

 Crêpe (textile)
Momie cloth

References 

Woven fabrics